Bivins is an unincorporated community in eastern Cass County, Texas, United States.  It lies along State Highway 43 east of the city of Linden, the county seat of Cass County.  Its elevation is 318 feet (97 m), and it is located at  (33.0195772, -94.1990757).  Although Bivins is unincorporated, it has a post office, with the ZIP code of 75555.

References

Unincorporated communities in Cass County, Texas
Unincorporated communities in Texas